Bramall may refer to:

People:
 Edwin Bramall, Baron Bramall (1923–2019) British field marshal
 John Bramall (1923–2000), English sound engineer

Other uses:
 Bramall Hall, a manor house in Greater Manchester, England 
 Bramall Lane, a football stadium in Sheffield, England

See also
 Bramhall